Demal mac Rothechtaid was the son of Rothechtaid mac Main who, according to medieval legend and tradition, was a High King of Ireland.

Legendary High Kings of Ireland